The 2022 NACAM Formula 4 Championship season was the sixth season of the NACAM Formula 4 Championship. It began on 26 March at Autódromo de Quéretaro in El Marqués and ended on 30 October at Autódromo Hermanos Rodríguez in Mexico City with the additional, non-championship, round held on 9–10 December at the same circuit.

Teams and drivers
All teams were Mexican-registered.

Notes

Race calendar

All rounds were held in Mexico. The first five rounds were a part of the Copa Notiauto series roster, whereas the last round was held in the support of the 2022 Mexico City Grand Prix. The non-championship round staged after the season finale was confirmed later, and was held in the support of the Copa Notiauto's Endurance 24 race.

Championship standings

Points were awarded to the top 10 classified finishers in each race. Only the best 4 of 5 three-race rounds count towards the final point tally.

Drivers' Championship

References

External links 

  

2022
NACAM
NACAM
NACAM